Signed and Sealed in Blood is the eighth studio album by the Dropkick Murphys. The album was released on January 8, 2013, on the band's Born & Bred Records label. The album debuted at No. 9 on the Billboard 200 albums chart, the third highest debut for the band.

The album has produced four singles including "Rose Tattoo" and "The Season's Upon Us", a Christmas themed song that became one of the band's more successful charting singles. "The Boys Are Back" and "Out of Our Heads" (which was also used as the theme song for the television show, Boston's Finest) were also released as singles. A special 2013 charity version titled "Rose Tattoo" featuring Bruce Springsteen was released in response to the Boston Marathon bombing. The single reached #25 on the Rock Songs chart. "Prisoner's Song" has been heavily featured in commercials for Captain Morgan's liquor and in July 2017 it was used in the season 8 trailer for The Walking Dead. It was also the final album to feature Scruffy Wallace on Bagpipes and Whistles.

Background
On August 31, 2012, the band announced the album's title and first single, "Rose Tattoo" through their Facebook page. The title of the album is taken from lyrics in "Rose Tattoo". The band asked fans to tattoo themselves with the new logo from the album's cover and send photos and videos to their web site by September 19, 2012. The images were used in the packaging for the CD and vinyl album.

The album has sold 106,000 copies .

Musical style
Where "Going Out in Style" told the story of a fictional character named Cornelius Larkin—complete with an obituary written by Michael Patrick MacDonald for the liner notes -- "Signed..." has no such constraints. "This is just the opposite of that," bassist Ken Casey explains, "just us having fun and making the most catchy, singalong kind of songs we can. It's not that the last album wasn't fun. It was. 'Going Out in Style' is one of the records I'm most proud of, of anything we've done. But it gave me a couple migraines along the way, getting through that because everything was so connected. This time we cut loose." But he does feel that "Signed..." is also "almost a continuation of ('Going Out in Style'), in a musical sense. There's an upbeat, party vibe to it. A lot of these songs, we were having such a good time writing them and just enjoying the writing process. It's the quickest we've released an album, ever, after another."

The group previewed some of the songs on the album during its Halfway To St. Patrick's Day U.S. tour. Casey described the final track, "End of the Night," as "the closing time, kind of loser's anthem, about people who don't want to go home." The album also features a holiday song called "The Seasons Upon Us," which Casey promised "is definitely not some cheesy Christmas tune. It's about a dysfunctional family."

Critical reception

Signed and Sealed in Blood was well received by music critics. The album holds an average critic score of 77/100 at Metacritic, based on 17 critics, indicating "generally favorable reviews". Gregory Heaney of AllMusic gave the album four out of five stars called it "an album that's sure to please Murphys fans both old and new". At The Observer, Hermione Hoby gave the album two stars out of five, criticising it as 'hearty but slightly absurd'.

Track listing

Fans who pre-ordered the album through the band's website received MP3 download of the song, "The Season's Upon Us" as well as a digital download card with their order which included three exclusive songs. "The Season's Upon Us" was also released as a 7-inch single in special colors of red, green and white with the non-album b-side "AK-47 (All I Want For Christmas Is An)".

Personnel
Dropkick Murphys
Al Barr – lead vocals
Tim Brennan – guitars, accordion, bouzouki, piano, whistle, vocals
Ken Casey – lead vocals, bass guitar
Jeff DaRosa – banjo, bouzouki, mandolin, mandola, acoustic guitar, piano, autoharp, vocals
Matt Kelly – drums, vocals
James Lynch – guitars, vocals
Scruffy Wallace – bagpipes, whistles

Additional musicians
Winston Marshall - guest banjo on "Rose Tattoo"
Michelle DaRosa - vocals on "Rose Tattoo" and "The Season's Upon Us"
Parkington Sisters - strings on various songs, vocals on "End of the Night" and "Shark Attack"
Niki Cremmen - vocals on "Rose Tattoo"
So Many Close Friends - additional gang vocals on various songs

References

2013 albums
Dropkick Murphys albums
Albums produced by Ted Hutt